"The Dull Flame of Desire" is a song recorded by Icelandic singer Björk featuring Anohni from the band Antony and the Johnsons. It was released as the fifth and final single from her seventh full-length studio album, Volta, on 29 September 2008. She sung it twelve times on her global Volta Tour, often with Anohni.

Background
The entirety of the lyrics to The Dull Flame of Desire are an English translation of a Russian poem by Fyodor Tyutchev, from its original appearance in the Andrei Tarkovsky film Stalker (1979).

Music video

It was first reported on the official site of Antony and the Johnsons that Anohni and Björk had shot a video for "Dull Flame of Desire". The news was subsequently removed from the site. A few months later Björk revealed in an interview that she and Anohni had recorded themselves singing the song against a green screen in New York, and that she had sent the raw footage to three directors who had taken part in the video contest for her previous single "Innocence".

It was later announced that Christoph Jantos (Berlin), Masahiro Mogari (Tokyo), and Marçal Cuberta Juncà (Girona) were the chosen directors. Each director was given their own section of the film to develop how they wished - on completion the three films were edited together in London to make the final music video.

The video has three segments. In the first part (directed by Masahiro Mogari), a lot of little white dots are moving until they form Björk and Anohni's faces. The second part (directed by Marçal Cuberta) features the footage of Björk and Anohni with a threshold effect. In the third part (directed by Christoph Jantos, animated by Marta Bala), their faces are seen moving until both faces morph into one.

A different edit of the video was done for one of Modeselektor's remixes of the song and shown on MTV.

Track listing
The limited edition "multiformat" box set consists of a sticker-sealed fold out box with five colored nesting boxes containing two 12" vinyl singles, a CD and a DVD in colored paper sleeves. The release includes two new remixes by Modeselektor of "The Dull Flame of Desire" and a new remix of Björk's previous single "Innocence" by Sinden. The Mark Stent mixes refer to the album version and its instrumental.

Twelve-inch double heavyweight vinyl
 "Dull Flame of Desire" (Modeselektor’s Rmx for Girls)
 "Dull Flame of Desire" (Modeselektor’s Rmx for Boys)
 "Innocence" (Sinden Remix)
 "Dull Flame of Desire" (Mark Stent Album Mix)

CD
 "Dull Flame of Desire" (Modeselektor’s Rmx For Girls)
 "Dull Flame of Desire" (Modeselektor’s Rmx For Boys)
 "Dull Flame of Desire" (Mark Stent Album Mix)
 "Dull Flame of Desire" (Video / Radio Edit)
 "Dull Flame of Desire" (Mark Stent Instrumental)
 "Innocence" (Sinden Remix)

DVD
 "Dull Flame of Desire" (Music video)

Charts

References

External links
The Dull Flame Of Desire releases at Discogs
Volta website

2007 songs
2008 singles
Björk songs
Song recordings produced by Björk
Songs written by Björk
One Little Indian Records singles
Female vocal duets
Chamber pop songs
Songs based on poems